Phelps Creek is a river in Fenton, New York, United States. Its origin is a pond in Fenton, and its mouth is the Chenango River in Port Dickinson.

See also
List of rivers in New York

Rivers of New York (state)
Rivers of Broome County, New York

Burtis, John, "'Crick' holds fond memories of a freer time",  Press & Sun-Bulletin, Binghamton, NY, Tuesday, June 20, 1995, p. 5A